Marko Panić (born 10 March 1991) is a Bosnian handball player for Montpellier Handball and the Bosnian national team.

He represented Bosnia and Herzegovina at the 2020 European Men's Handball Championship.

References

External links

1991 births
Living people
Bosnia and Herzegovina male handball players
Expatriate handball players in Poland
Bosnia and Herzegovina expatriate sportspeople in Belarus
Bosnia and Herzegovina expatriate sportspeople in France
Bosnia and Herzegovina expatriate sportspeople in Poland
RK Borac Banja Luka players
People from Jajce
Serbs of Bosnia and Herzegovina